Paracentrophorus is an extinct genus of prehistoric ray-finned fish that lived during the Induan age of the Early Triassic epoch in what is now Madagascar. The type species is Paracentrophorus madagascariensis (monotypy). 

Paracentrophorus is classified as a neopterygian. According to Jean Piveteau, it belongs to Semionotidae.

See also

 Prehistoric fish
 List of prehistoric bony fish

References

Early Triassic fish